Kasper Povlsen (born 26 September 1989) is a retired Danish footballer. He is notably right-footed.

Retirement
In December 2018, Povlsen announced that he would retire at the end of the year due to some serious injuries. 

Two years after his retirement, in December 2020, it was confirmed that Povlsen had returned to his childhood club Dronningborg Boldklub, as assistant manager. On 22 March 2021, he was also hired as an youth coach at AGF. In July 2022 Povlsen confirmed, that he had been hired as head of the clubs talent center.

References

External links
 National team profile
 Official Danish League stats
 

1989 births
Living people
Danish men's footballers
Denmark under-21 international footballers
Denmark youth international footballers
Aarhus Gymnastikforening players
Vendsyssel FF players
Hobro IK players
Danish Superliga players
Association football midfielders